Mimopacha tripunctata is a species of moth in the family Lasiocampidae described by Per Olof Christopher Aurivillius in 1905.

This species has a wingspan of 43 mm.

Distribution
It is known from Nigeria, Kenya, Uganda and Tanzania.

References

Moths described in 1905
Lasiocampidae
Moths of Africa